Masoud Soleimani Shojaei  (born 9 June 1984) is an Iranian professional footballer who plays for Havadar. Mainly an attacking midfielder, he can also play as a winger or forward.

After playing in his country for two clubs and with Al-Sharjah in the United Arab Emirates, he went on to spend several seasons in Spain with Osasuna, appearing in 112 official matches.

An Iranian international since 2004, Shojaei represented his country in three World Cups and four Asian Cups.

Club career

Early years
Shojaei was born in Shiraz, and lived most of his life in Abadan and Tehran. He started his career with Sanat Naft Abadan F.C. before moving to Saipa F.C. of Karaj in the Iran Pro League; having signed at the age of 19, he went on to play three seasons with the latter.

After the 2006 World Cup, Shojaei moved to the United Arab Emirates and signed for Al Sharjah SC. He scored his first goal for the club in the League on 3 October, against Emirates Club.

Osasuna
On 23 June 2008, after previous attempts from VfL Wolfsburg in Germany and Italy's S.S.C. Napoli, Shojaei signed with Spanish side CA Osasuna for three years, teaming up with compatriot Javad Nekounam. The deal included a €6 million buyout clause for the first 18 months of his contract, being reduced to €3.5 million for the remainder of his stay.

Shojaei made his La Liga debut on 31 August 2008, playing 32 minutes in a 1–1 home draw against Villarreal CF. During his first two seasons he appeared almost always as a substitute, as the Navarrese managed to maintain its division status; the player remained a regular even after the coaching change at the club, as José Ángel Ziganda was replaced by José Antonio Camacho.

Shojaei – who was addressed by his first name during his spell in Spain – appeared regularly again for Osasuna in the 2010–11 campaign, but also spent one month at the 2011 AFC Asian Cup with his national team. In late May he renewed his contract with the club for another two seasons, also having the option of an annual renewal of his link.

Shojaei spent the entire 2011–12 on the sidelines, due to injury. On 25 February 2013, in only his fourth appearance since returning, he scored a stunning goal to help Osasuna win it 2–0 at Levante UD.

Despite a solid start to his spell, Shojaei was eventually released in June 2013. Shortly after, he was linked with a move to fellow league club Real Valladolid, but nothing came of it.

Las Palmas
On 3 September 2013, Shojaei moved clubs but stayed in Spain, joining Segunda División side UD Las Palmas on a one-year contract. He found the net in his debut, in a 3–1 away victory over CE Sabadell FC for the second round of the Copa del Rey.

Shojaei scored twice and provided an assist in the first half of the league fixture against the same opponent on 15 March 2014, in an eventual 5–0 home win.

Qatar
After the 2014 World Cup, Shojaei turned down an offer from Real Zaragoza and moved to Al-Shahania Sports Club in the Qatar Stars League alongside compatriot Mehrdad Pooladi. On 14 December 2014, he scored a hat-trick in a 3–1 away win against eventual runners-up Al Sadd SC; one year later, after suffering relegation, he joined fellow league club Al-Gharafa Sports Club for $1 million.

Greece
On 22 July 2016, Shojaei joined Super League Greece side Panionios F.C. on a one-year contract. He enjoyed a successful first season, and subsequently extended his contract until June 2018; on 25 December 2017, however, he severed his link by mutual consent and agreed to a six-month deal at fellow league team AEK Athens F.C. three days later, announcing on his Instagram he would be wearing number 24 in tribute of Hadi Norouzi who died in 2015. He made his debut on 6 January, replacing Anastasios Bakasetas in the second half of the match against Panetolikos F.C. and later providing the assist for Hélder Lopes goal, in a 4–1 away win. He started his first match three days later against the same opponent, making another assist in a 1–0 victory for the Greek Football Cup's round of 16 and being named as the most valuable player of the match for his performance.

On 1 March 2018, Shojaei put the visitors ahead in their domestic cup semi-final fixture away to Athlitiki Enosi Larissa FC, in an eventual 1–2 loss which marked his first goal for the club and the first loss in 26 matches for Manolo Jiménez's team. On 27 June, after he contributed to the club's first national championship conquest in 24 years, his contract was terminated.

Tractor

On 2 August 2018, Shojaei joined Tractor S.C. on a three-year contract. 8 days later, he made his debut in a 3–0 defeat against Esteghlal F.C. in which he was chosen as the side's first captain. On 19 April 2019, he was assaulted by a supporter of his own team who invaded the pitch after a 1–0 home defeat of Paykan FC.

Midway through the 2019–20 campaign, Shojaei was offered the interim position after Mustafa Denizli's departure. He declined, instead being named assistant to Ahad Sheykhlari while also being involved in the taking of decisions in training.

Nassaji
On 5 October 2021, Shojaei joined Nassaji on a two-year contract, reuniting with former Tractor manager Saket Elhami. Following his arrival, he was named the team's new captain. On 27 February in the 2022 Hazfi Cup Final, he played the first half of a goalless draw with Aluminium Arak that his team won on penalties.

International career

Whilst at Saipa, Shojaei earned a place in Iranian national under-23 team, catching the eye of full side coach Branko Ivanković. He was first called up to play for the latter in November 2004, for a 2006 FIFA World Cup qualifier against Laos – it was the only cap he would win until the training camp prior to the finals in Germany, held in Switzerland; he was included in the final squad but only appeared once in the tournament, replacing injured Mohammad Nosrati in the early minutes of the 1–1 draw against Angola.

Shojaei began appearing more regularly in the 2010 World Cup qualification stages, scoring in a 1–1 draw against South Korea in the final game. However, Team Melli did not qualify for the tournament in South Africa. Iran did manage to reach the 2014 World Cup, with Shojaei as a regular starter in the qualifiers.

On 1 June 2014, Shojaei was included in Carlos Queiroz's list for the World Cup. He appeared as a substitute in the team's opening draw with Nigeria, and was selected in the starting line-up for the following group matches against Argentina and Bosnia-Herzegovina.

On 30 December 2014, Shojaei was called into Iran's 2015 AFC Asian Cup squad. He scored the nation's second goal in its opening 2–0 defeat of Bahrain, in Melbourne.

Shojaei captained the squad in 2018 World Cup qualification home matches against China and Uzbekistan. On 10 August 2017, Mohammad Reza Davarzani, Iran's deputy sports minister, said on Iranian state television both Shojaei and teammate Ehsan Hajsafi would never be invited to the national team again for playing with their club Panionios against Israel's Maccabi Tel Aviv FC; however, the Iranian Football Federation later stated it would review the case and reach a decision after speaking with both, with Hajsafi eventually returning to the side in November and Shojaei stating that they were pressured by their club to play.

On 18 March 2018, Shojaei was called up for friendlies against Tunisia and Algeria, being criticised after his return against the former by an Iranian member of parliament who called for his life ban. He was eventually selected for the finals in Russia as team captain, becoming the first Iranian player to travel to three World Cups. He made his debut in the tournament on 15 June in a 1–0 group stage win against Morocco, but sat on the bench for the next two games in an eventual group stage elimination.

In December 2018, Shojaei was selected for Iran's 23-man squad for the 2019 AFC Asian Cup. He became the only Iranian to participate in seven international tournaments.

Activism
 
Shojaei expressed support for the Iranian Green Movement on 17 June 2009, when he wore a green bracelet against South Korea in a World Cup 2010 qualifier along with five other players. During the match, he also wore a green undershirt previewing a possible goal celebration.

Shojaei discussed corruption in Iranian football in an interview with Radio Farda, and also spoke out against child sexual abuses in December 2016. He was subsequently summoned to the Ethics Committee of the Football Federation Islamic Republic of Iran.

A vocal advocate of lifting stadium ban for women in Iran, Shojaei openly expressed his regret that his mother, sister and wife were unable to see him play. He reportedly called for repealing the ban, when he met with president Hassan Rouhani in July 2017.

Personal life
Shojaei's sister, Maryam, was also an activist campaigning for women's rights in Iran.

Career statistics

Club

International

Scores and results list Iran's goal tally first, score column indicates score after each Shojaei goal.

Honours
AEK Athens
Super League: 2017–18

Tractor
Hazfi Cup: 2019–20

Nassaji
Hazfi Cup: 2021–22

Iran
Islamic Solidarity Games: Bronze medal 2005

Individual
Super League Greece Team of the Season: 2016–17

References

External links

TeamMelli official profile

1984 births
Living people
People from Shiraz
Iranian footballers
Association football midfielders
Persian Gulf Pro League players
Sanat Naft Abadan F.C. players
Saipa F.C. players
Tractor S.C. players
UAE Pro League players
Sharjah FC players
La Liga players
Segunda División players
CA Osasuna players
UD Las Palmas players
Qatar Stars League players
Al-Shahania SC players
Al-Gharafa SC players
Super League Greece players
Panionios F.C. players
AEK Athens F.C. players
Iran international footballers
2006 FIFA World Cup players
2007 AFC Asian Cup players
2011 AFC Asian Cup players
2014 FIFA World Cup players
2015 AFC Asian Cup players
2018 FIFA World Cup players
2019 AFC Asian Cup players
Iranian expatriate footballers
Expatriate footballers in the United Arab Emirates
Expatriate footballers in Spain
Expatriate footballers in Qatar
Expatriate footballers in Greece
Iranian expatriate sportspeople in the United Arab Emirates
Iranian expatriate sportspeople in Spain
Iranian expatriate sportspeople in Qatar
Iranian expatriate sportspeople in Greece
Iranian women's rights activists
Sportspeople from Fars province
Nassaji Mazandaran players